The Cahaboncito River is a river of Guatemala.

See also
List of rivers of Guatemala

References
Maplandia

Rivers of Guatemala